The following is a partial list of dams and reservoirs in the United States. There are an estimated 84,000 dams in the United States, impounding  of river or about 17% of rivers in the nation.

By state

Alabama

Alaska

Arizona

Arkansas

California

Colorado

Aurora Reservoir
Barker Dam – Barker Reservoir
Blue Mesa Dam – Blue Mesa Reservoir
Chatfield Reservoir
Cherry Creek Reservoir
Dillon Reservoir
Electra Lake
Elkhead Reservoir
Englewood Dam
Green Mountain Reservoir
Gross Dam – Gross Reservoir
Horsetooth Dam – Horsetooth Reservoir, built as part of the Colorado-Big Thompson project
John Martin Reservoir
McNulty Reservoir Dam
McPhee Dam – McPhee Reservoir
Morrow Point Dam – Morrow Point Reservoir
Mount Elbert Forebay Dam
Navajo Reservoir
Olympus Dam in Estes Park, Colorado, built as part of the Colorado-Big Thompson project
Quincy Reservoir, in Aurora
Ralston Dam
Ridgway Dam – Ridgway Reservoir, built as part of the Dallas Creek Project
Silver Jack Dam – Silver Jack Reservoir, part of the Bostwick Park Project
Trinidad Dam
Vallecito Reservoir
Williams Fork Reservoir
Wolford Mountain Reservoir

Connecticut

Beseck Lake Dam
Candlewood Lake
Leesville Dam – Salmon River
Mansfield Hollow Dam – Mansfield Hollow Lake
Saville Dam – Barkhamsted Reservoir
Stevenson Dam – Lake Zoar, on the Housatonic River
West Thompson Dam – Quinebaug River

Delaware

Florida

Georgia

Allatoona Dam – Lake Allatoona
Bartlett's Ferry Dam – Lake Harding
Blue Ridge Dam – Blue Ridge Reservoir; on the Toccoa River; finished in 1930; acquired by the TVA in 1939
Buford Dam – Lake Lanier
Carters Dam – Carter's Lake
Chatuge Dam – Chatuge Reservoir; on the Hiwassee River; finished in 1942 by the TVA
 Lake Delano
 Lake Dorene
Clark Hill Dam (J. Strom Thurmond Dam) – Lake Strom Thurmond, also in South Carolina
Goat Rock Dam – Goat Rock Lake
Hartwell Dam – Lake Hartwell, also in South Carolina
Hickory Log Creek Dam – Hickory Log Creek Reservoir (under construction until Oct 2007)
Jim Woodruff Dam – Lake Seminole; on Apalachicola River; built by USACE
Kelly Barnes Dam – Toccoa Falls, failed in 1977 killing 39 people
Lake Blackshear Dam – Lake Blackshear
Morgan Falls Dam – Bull Sluice Lake
Nottely Dam – Nottely Reservoir; on the Nottely River; finished in 1942 by the TVA
Oliver Dam – Lake Oliver
Richard B. Russell Dam – Richard B. Russell Lake, also in South Carolina
Sinclair Dam – Lake Sinclair
Wallace Dam – Lake Oconee
Walter F. George Lake – on the Chattahoochee River; built by USACE
West Point Dam – West Point Lake

Hawaii

Idaho

Illinois

Fordham Dam
Kaskaskia Lock and Dam
Lake Holiday Dam, Lake Holiday
Lock and Dam#27
McHenry Dam
Melvin Price Locks and Dam, Alton

Indiana

Iowa

Kansas

Kentucky

Louisiana

Bailey's Dam
Sibley Lake Dam
Toledo Bend Reservoir

Maine

Maryland

Massachusetts

Ashley Reservoir – (Artificial)
Assawompset Pond Dam – Nemasket River
Ballardvale Dam – Shawsheen River
Barre Falls Dam – Ware River
Barstows Pond Dam – Cotley River
Birch Hill Dam – Millers River
Buffumville Dam – Little River
Cleveland Pond Dam – Beaver Brook
Conant Brook Dam – Conant Brook
Dam 1 above Harodite factory – concrete and granite blocks – Three Mile River
Dam 2 above Harodite factory – concrete – Three Mile River
Dam at 60 Winnetuxet Road – Winnetuxet River
Dam at Draka Factory – Three Mile River
Dam at Furnace Street – Stump Brook
Dam at Robbins Pond/Bog Reservoir Connection – Stump Brook
Dam at Route 106 – Satucket River
East Brimfield Dam – Quinebaug River
Fall Brook Route 28 Dam – Fall Brook
First Unnamed Dam – Segreganset River
Forge Pond Dam – Assonet River
Forge Pond Dam – Meadow Brook
Framingham Reservoir No. 1 Dam and Gatehouse
Framingham Reservoir No. 2 Dam and Gatehouse
Framingham Reservoir No. 3 Dam and Gatehouse
Great Quittacas Pond Dam – Nemasket River
Great Stone Dam – Merrimack River
Happy Hollow Farm Dam – Fall Brook
High Street Dam – Town River
Hodges Village Dam – French River
Holyoke Dam – Connecticut River
Hunts Pond Dam (Mill Street Dam) – Beaver Brook
Johnson Pond Dam – Forge River
Hewitt Pond Dam – Forge River
King's Pond Dam – Pine Swamp Brook
Knightville Dam – Westfield River
Lake Rico Dam – Furnace Brook
Littleville Dam – Middle Branch, Westfield River
Monument Dam – Assonet River
Morey's Bridge Dam – Mill River
Muddy Cove Brook (Obstruction 1) – gate under railroad tracks just below Route 138 – Muddy Cove Brook
Muddy Cove Brook (Obstruction 2) – dam on Zeneca Inc. Property – Muddy Cove Brook
Muddy Cove Pond Dam – Muddy Cove Brook
Mystic Dam – Upper Mystic Lake
Oliver Mills Dam – Nemasket River
Orchard Street Dam – Dam Lot Brook
Outlet for Bleachery Reservoir (Eastern) – Rattlesnake Brook
Outlet for Bleachery Reservoir (Western) – Rattlesnake Brook
Plymouth Street Dam – Taunton River
Richmond Pond Dam – Richmond Pond
Segreganset River Dam – Segreganset River
Stump Brook Dam – Stump Brook
Swansea Dam – Swansea, Massachusetts
Taunton State Hospital Dam – Mill River
Tisdale Dam – Assonet River
Tracy Pond Dam – Forge River
Tully Dam – Millers River
Turners Falls Dam – Connecticut River
Unnamed dam above Berkley Street – Tributary above Berkley Street in Taunton (MA)
Unnamed dam at Raynham Department of Parks & Recreation Office – Forge River
Wachusett Dam – Wachusett Reservoir
War Memorial Park Dam – Town River
Wareham Street Dam – Nemasket River
West Brittania Dam – Mill River
West Hill Dam – West River
Westville Dam – Quinebaug River
Whittenton Street Dam – Mill River (removed)
Willow Avenue Dam – Meadow Brook
Winnetuxet Road Dam – Winnetuxet River
Winsor Dam – Quabbin Reservoir
Wrights Complex Lower Dam – concrete and cut stone masonry – Quaboag River

Michigan

Minnesota

Mississippi

Aberdeen Lock and Dam – Aberdeen Lake
Jamie Whitten Lock and Dam
John C. Stennis Lock and Dam – Columbus Lake
Okatibbee Dam
Ross Barnett Reservoir and Spillway
Grenada Lake

Missouri

 Amarugia Lake
 Atkinson Lake
 Bean Lake
 Big Lake
 Bilby Ranch Lake
 Binder Lake
 Blind Pony Lake
 Blue Springs Lake
 Bull Shoals Lake (extends into Arkansas)
 Bushwacker Lake
 Cameron City Lakes
 Che-Ru Lake
 Clearwater Lake
 Cooley Lake
 Cottontail Lake
 Fellows Lake
 Flight Lake
 Forest Lake
 Halls Lake
 Henry Sever Lake
 Hunnewell Lake
 Indian Creek Lake
 Kendzora Lake
 Lake Girardeau
 Lake of the Ozarks
 Lake Paho
 Lake Springfield
 Lake Taneycomo
 Little Compton Lake
 Little Dixie Lake
 Little Prairie Community Lake
 Longview Lake
 Lower Taum Sauk Lake
 Manito Lake
 Maple Leaf Lake
 Mark Twain Lake
 McDaniel Lake
 Miller Community Lake
 Montrose Lake
 Nodaway County Lake
 Norfork Lake (extends into Arkansas)
 Perry County Community Lake
 Pomme de Terre Lake
 Pony Express Lake
 Ray County Community Lake
 Rocky Fork Lake
 Sears Community Lake
 Shawnee Mac Lakes
 Sims Valley Community Lake
 Smithville Lake
 Stockton Lake
 Table Rock Lake (extends into Arkansas)
 Thomas Hill Lake
 Tri-City Lake
 Truman Reservoir (largest lake in Missouri)
 Upper Big Lake
 Vandalia Lake
 Wappapello Lake
 Weatherby Lake
 Williams Creek Lake

Montana

Nebraska

Nevada

New Hampshire

New Jersey

New Mexico

Abiquiu Lake
Bluewater Lake
Cochiti Dam
Conchas Lake
Elephant Butte Dike
El Vado Lake
Galisteo Dam
Heron Lake
Jemez Canyon Dam
Navajo Lake
Santa Rosa Dam
Two Rivers Dam
Ute Dam

New York

North Carolina

Lake Adger - Green River (North Carolina); completed in 1925 
Apalachia Dam – Apalachia Reservoir; on the Hiwassee River; finished in 1943 by the TVA
Lake Blue Devil – Duke Power
Cheoah Dam – built in 1919 and owned by Alcoa
Cowans Ford Dam and Lake Norman – Duke Power
Falls Lake – USACE
Fontana Dam – Fontana Reservoir; on the Little Tennessee River; finished in 1944 by the TVA
Gaston Dam – Lake Gaston; on the Roanoke River; built by the Virginia Electric Power Company (VEPCO)
High Rock Lake – on the Yadkin River; built in 1927 by USACE and operated today by Alcoa
Hiwassee Dam – Hiwassee Reservoir; on the Hiwassee River; finished in 1940 by the TVA
B. Everett Jordan Lake – on the Haw River; built by USACE
Little River Reservoir – finished in 1987
Lake Lure – Duke Power
Lake Michie – finished in 1926, on the Flat River
Mountain Island Dam and Mountain Island Lake – Duke Power
Lake Nottely – on the Nottely River; built 1941–1942; operated by the TVA
Randleman Lake Dam, completed in 2003
Rocky Mount Mills Dam - built in the early 1800s at a rocky outcrop for which the city is named; designed to accommodate the needs of the cotton mill
Santeetlah Dam – built in 1928 and owned by Alcoa
Tar River Reservoir - Owned by the City of Rocky Mount and used for the city's water supply
Tuxedo Dam - Lake Summit on the Green River (North Carolina); completed in 1920

North Dakota

Ohio

Acton Lake
Alum Creek Lake
Atwood Lake
Beach City Lake
Bolivar Dam
Caesar Creek Lake
Charles Mill Lake
Choctaw Lake
Clarence J. Brown Reservoir
Clearfork Reservoir
Clendening Lake
Comet Lake
Comet Lake Dam
Cowan Lake
Deer Creek Lake
Delaware Dam
Dillon Lake
Dover Dam
Englewood Dam
Germantown Dam
Grand Lake St. Marys – Reservoir for the now defunct Miami and Erie Canal
Griggs Dam
Hannibal Locks and Dam
Hoover Dam
Huffman Dam
LaDue Reservoir
Lake Glacier Dam
Lake Milton
Leesville Lake
Liggett Lake
Liggett Lake Dam
Lockington Dam
Madison Lake
Madison Lake Dam
Michael J. Kirwan Reservoir
Mohawk Dam
Mohicanville Dam
North Branch of Kokosing River Lake
O'Shaughnessy Dam
Paint Creek Lake
Piedmont Lake
Pleasant Hill Lake
Providence Dam
Salt Fork Reservoir
Senecaville Lake
Tappan Lake
Taylorsville Dam
Tom Jenkins Dam
William Harsha Lake
Wills Creek Lake

Oklahoma

 Altus City Reservoir
 Lake Altus-Lugert
 American Horse Lake
 Lake of the Arbuckles
 Arcadia Lake
 Ardmore City Lake
 Atoka Lake
 Bellcow Lake
 Birch Lake
 Lake Bixhoma
 Black Kettle Lake	
 Bluestem Lake
 Boomer Lake
 Broken Bow Lake
 Brushy Creek Reservoir
 Lake Burtschi
 Canton Lake
 Carl Albert Lake
 Carl Blackwell Lake
 Lake Carl Etling	
 Lake Carlton
 Carter Lake
 Cedar Lake
 Chandler Lake
 Lake Checotah
 Lake Chickasha
 Chouteau Lock and Dam
 Claremore Lake
 Clayton Lake
 Clear Creek Lake
 Cleveland City Lake
 Clinton Lake
 Coalgate City Lake
 Comanche Lake
 Copan Lake
 Cordell Reservoir
 Crowder Lake
 Cushing Municipal Lake
 Lake Dahlgren
 Dripping Springs Lake
 Lake Durant
 Lake Ellsworth
 Lake El Reno
 Lake Eucha
 Foss Reservoir
 Fort Cobb Reservoir
 Fort Gibson Lake
 Fort Supply Lake
 Fuqua Lake
 Greenleaf Lake
 Grand Lake O' the Cherokees
 Great Salt Plains Lake
 Guthrie Lake
 Heyburn Lake
 Lake Hudson (formerly named Markham Ferry Reservoir)
 Hulah Lake
 Lake Jean Neustadt
 Lake Jed Johnson
 Keystone Lake
 Konawa Reservoir
 Lake Lawtonka
 Liberty Lake
 Lloyd Church Lake	
 McGee Creek Reservoir
 Nanih Waiyah Lake
 Lake McMurtry
 Mountain Lake
 Lake Murray
 Oklahoma Lake
 Okmulgee Lake
 Lake Overholser
 Ozzie Cobb Lake
 Pine Creek Lake
 Pauls Valley Lake
 Lake R.C. Longmire
 Raymond Gary Lake
 Rock Creek Reservoir
 Shawnee Twin Lakes
 Skiatook Lake
 Sooner Lake
 Lake Spavinaw
 Sportsman Lake
 Lake Stanley Draper
 Tom Steed Reservoir
 Lake Talequah
 Lake Thunderbird
 Waurika Lake
 Lake Wayne Wallace
 W.D. Mayo Lock and Dam	
 Webbers Falls Reservoir
 Wes Watkins Reservoir
 Wewoka Lake
 Lake Wister
 Lake W. R. Holway
 Lake Yahola

Oregon

Antelope Reservoir – Jack Creek, a tributary of Jordan Creek (Owyhee River tributary)
Applegate Lake – Applegate River
Blue River Reservoir – Blue River, a tributary of the McKenzie River
Brownlee Dam – Snake River
Bull Run Lake and Reservoirs 1 and 2 – Bull Run River
Chickahominy Reservoir – Chickahominy Creek, a tributary of Silver Creek
Cooper Creek Reservoir – Cooper Creek, an Umpqua River tributary
Cottage Grove Lake – Coast Fork Willamette River
Cougar Reservoir and Cougar Dam – South Fork McKenzie River
Crane Prairie Reservoir – Deschutes River
Detroit Lake and Detroit Dam – North Santiam River
Dexter Reservoir and Dexter Dam – Middle Fork Willamette River
Devils Lake – D River
Dorena Reservoir - Row River 
Emigrant Lake – Emigrant Creek, a tributary of Bear Creek (Rogue River)
Fern Ridge Reservoir – Long Tom River
Foster Reservoir and Foster Dam – South Santiam River
Gatehouse, Portland City Reservoir No. 2
Green Peter Reservoir and Green Peter Dam– Middle Santiam River
Hells Canyon Reservoir and Hells Canyon Dam – Snake River
Henry Hagg Lake and Scoggins Dam – Scoggins Creek, a tributary of the Tualatin River
Hills Creek Reservoir & Hills Creek Dam – Middle Fork Willamette River
John C. Boyle Dam – Klamath River
Lake Billy Chinook & Round Butte Dam – Crooked, Deschutes, and Metolius rivers
Lake Bonneville & Bonneville Dam – Columbia River
Lake Celilo & The Dalles Dam – Columbia River
Lake Umatilla & John Day Dam – Columbia River
Lake Wallula & McNary Dam – Columbia River
Lookout Point Lake – Middle Fork Willamette River
Lost Creek Lake & William L. Jess Dam – Rogue River
McGuire Reservoir – Nestucca River
McNulty Reservoir (Malheur County, Oregon)
North Fork Reservoir – Clackamas River
Owyhee Reservoir – Owyhee River
Oxbow Dam – Snake River
Pelton Dam – Deschutes River
Phillips Lake – Powder River
Prineville Reservoir & Bowman Dam a.k.a. Prineville Dam – Crooked River
Silverton Reservoir – Silver Creek
Thief Valley Reservoir – Powder River
Upper McNulty Reservoir
Warm Springs Reservoir – Malheur River
Wickiup Reservoir – Deschutes River

Pennsylvania

Rhode Island

South Carolina

Conestee Mill Dam – Conestee Lake
Hartwell Dam – Lake Hartwell, also in the U.S. state of Georgia
Clark Hill Dam (J. Strom Thurmond Dam) – Lake Strom Thurmond, also in the U.S. state of Georgia
Jocassee Dam – Lake Jocassee
Keowee Dam
Monticello Reservoir – Jenkinsville, South Carolina
Pinopolis Dam – Lake Moultrie
Richard B. Russell Dam – Richard B. Russell Lake, also in the U.S. state of Georgia
Saluda Dam – Lake Murray

South Dakota

Tennessee

Boone Dam — Boone Lake; on the South Fork Holston River; finished in 1952 by the TVA
Burgess Falls Dam; on the Falling Water River; built by City of Cookeville for electric generation after the flood of 1928 destroyed a previous earthen dam
Calderwood Dam; on the Little Tennessee River; built in 1930 and owned by Alcoa
Cedar Dam — Cedar Reservoir; on Haley Creek, tributary of the Beech River; finished in 1963 by the TVA
Center Hill Dam — Center Hill Lake; on the Caney Fork; finished in 1948 by the United States Army Corps of Engineers
Cheatham Dam — Cheatham Lake; on the Cumberland River; finished in 1952 by the United States Army Corps of Engineers
Cherokee Dam — Cherokee Lake; on the Holston River; finished in 1941 by the TVA
Chickamauga Dam — Chickamauga Lake; on the Tennessee River; built 1940 by the TVA
Chilhowee Dam; on the Little Tennessee River; built in 1957 and owned by Alcoa
Cordell Hull Dam — Cordell Hull Lake; on the Cumberland River; finished in 1973 by the United States Army Corps of Engineers
Dale Hollow Dam — Dale Hollow Reservoir on the Obey River completed in 1943 by the United States Army Corps of Engineers
Dogwood Dam — Dogwood Reservoir; on Big Creek, tributary of the Beech River; finished in 1965 by the TVA
Douglas Dam — Douglas Lake; on the French Broad River; finished in 1943 by the TVA
Elk River Dam — Woods Reservoir; on the Elk River; finished in 1952 by the Corps of Engineers, to provide cooling water for the U.S. Air Force's Arnold Engineering Development Center
Fall Creek Falls Dam — Fall Creek Falls Reservoir; on Falls Creek; finished in 1970 by the Tennessee Department of Environment and Conservation
Fort Loudoun Dam — Fort Loudoun Lake; on the Tennessee River; finished in 1943 by the TVA
Fort Patrick Henry Dam — Fort Patrick Henry Lake; on the South Fork Holston River; finished in 1953 by the TVA
Great Falls Dam — Great Falls Reservoir; on the Caney Fork; finished in 1916 by the Tennessee Electric Power Co.; acquired by the TVA in 1939
Hales Bar Dam; on the Tennessee River, TVA dam mostly demolished in 1968, replaced by Nickajack Dam
Herb Parsons Dam — Herb Parsons Lake; on Mary's Creek
J. Percy Priest Dam — Percy Priest Lake; on the Stones River; finished in 1968 by the United States Army Corps of Engineers
Lost Creek Dam; flood control dam with no permanent reservoir; on Lost Creek, tributary of the Beech River; finished in 1963 by the TVA
Melton Hill Dam — Melton Hill Lake; on the Clinch River; finished in 1963 by the TVA
Nickajack Dam — Nickajack Lake; on the Tennessee River; finished in 1967 by the TVA
Nolichucky Dam — Davy Crockett Lake; on the Nolichucky River; finished in 1913 by the Tennessee Eastern Electric Co.; acquired by the TVA in 1945; taken out of service in 1972
Normandy Dam — Normandy Reservoir; on the Duck River; finished in 1976 by the TVA
Norris Dam — Norris Lake; on the Clinch River; finished in 1936 by the TVA
Ocoee Dam No. 1 — Parksville Reservoir; on the Ocoee River; finished in 1911 by the Eastern Tennessee Power Co.; acquired by the TVA in 1939
Ocoee Dam No. 2 — Ocoee Reservoir No. 2; on the Ocoee River; finished in 1913 by the Eastern Tennessee Power Co.; acquired by the TVA in 1939
Ocoee Dam No. 3 — Ocoee Reservoir No. 3; on the Ocoee River; finished in 1942 by the TVA
Old Hickory Lock and Dam — Old Hickory Lake; on the Cumberland River; finished in 1957 by the United States Army Corps of Engineers
Pickwick Landing Dam — Pickwick Lake; on the Tennessee River; finished in 1938 by the TVA
Pin Oak Dam — Pin Oak Reservoir; on Browns Creek, tributary of the Beech River; finished in 1964 by the TVA
Pine Dam — Pine Reservoir; on Piney Creek, tributary of the Beech River; finished in 1964 by the TVA
Raccoon Mountain Pumped-Storage Plant — Raccoon Mountain Reservoir; on McNabb Branch but discharges into the Tennessee River; finished in 1978 by the TVA
Radnor Dam — Radnor Lake; on Otter Creek; built by the Louisville and Nashville Railroad Company in 1914, for watering steam locomotives and supplying water for shipped livestock
Redbud Dam — Redbud Reservoir; on Dry Creek, tributary of the Beech River; finished in 1965 by the TVA
South Holston Dam — South Holston Lake; on the South Fork Holston River; finished in 1950 by the TVA
Sycamore Dam — Sycamore Reservoir; on Dry Branch, tributary of the Beech River; finished in 1965 by the TVA
Tellico Dam — Tellico Lake; on the Little Tennessee River; finished in 1979 by the TVA
Tims Ford Dam — Tims Ford Lake; on the Elk River; finished in 1970 by the TVA
Watauga Dam — Watauga Lake; on the Watauga River; finished in 1948 by the TVA
Watts Bar Dam — Watts Bar Lake; on the Tennessee River; finished in 1942 by the TVA
 Walterhill Dam — Walterhill Floodplain State Natural Area; on Stones River; finished in early 1900s.
Wilbur Dam — Wilbur Lake (tennessee); on the Watauga River; finished in 1912 by the Watauga Power Co.; acquired by the TVA in 1945
New Shoal Creek Dam; on Shoal Creek (Sycamore River), (Lawrence County, Lawrenceburg, Tennessee)

Texas

Utah

Vermont

Virginia

Beaver Creek Dam – flood control dam with no permanent reservoir; on Beaver Creek; finished in 1965 by the TVA
Bosher's Dam (also called Bosher Dam) – on the James River; first built in 1823
Clear Creek Dam and Clear Creek Reservoir – on Clear Creek; finished in 1965 by the TVA
Claytor Dam (hydroelectric) – on the New River; home of Claytor Lake State Park; between Dublin and Radford
John H. Kerr Dam and John H. Kerr Lake – on the Roanoke River; built by USACE; reservoir covers parts of Virginia/North Carolina border
Lake of The Woods Dam – near Fredericksburg
Lake of the Woods Dam Number Two – near Fredericksburg
Leesville Dam – on the Roanoke River; operated by Appalachian Power as part of the Smith Mountain pumped storage project
Little River Dam (hydroelectric) – on the Little River; owned by the city of Radford
Martinsville Dam – on the Smith River
Martinsville Fish Dam – NRHP landmark on the Smith River
Niagara Dam (hydroelectric) – on the Roanoke River near Vinton, Virginia; built in 1904
Philpott Lake – near Roanoke
Smith Mountain Dam (hydroelectric) and Smith Mountain Lake – on the Roanoke River; operated by Appalachian Power (American Electric Power)
Walker's Dam – on the Chickahominy River; forms Chickahominy Lake; operated by Newport News Waterworks

Washington

Blue Gulch Reservoir Dam
Bonneville Dam – Lake Bonneville (between Washington and Oregon)
Boundary Dam – Pend Oreille River
Box Canyon Dam – Pend Oreille River
Casad Dam – Union River
Chief Joseph Dam – Rufus Woods Lake
Culmback Dam – Spada Lake, Jackson Hydro Project
Dry Falls Dam – Banks Lake
Diablo Dam and Diablo Lake – Skagit River, Seattle City Light
Elwha Dam – Lake Aldwell
Glines Canyon Dam – Lake Mills
Gorge Dam – Skagit River, Seattle City Light
Grand Coulee Dam, largest hydroelectricity plant in the U.S. – Franklin D. Roosevelt Lake
Howard A. Hanson Dam – Green River,  Howard A. Hanson Reservoir
Ice Harbor Lock and Dam, Lake Sacajawea, lower Snake River
John Day Dam – Lake Umatilla (between Washington and Oregon)
Lake Lawrence Dam – Lake Lawrence
Little Goose Lock and Dam, Lake Bryan, lower Snake River
Lower Granite Lock and Dam, Lower Granite Lake, lower Snake River
Lower Monumental Lock and Dam, Lake Herbert G. West, lower Snake River
Masonry Dam, Chester Morse Lake, Cedar River
McNary Dam – Lake Wallula (between Washington and Oregon)
Merwin Dam – Lake Merwin
Mossyrock Dam – Riffe Lake
Priest Rapids Dam – Priest Rapids Lake
Rock Island Dam – Rock Island Pool
Rocky Reach Dam – Lake Entiat
Ross Dam and Ross Lake – Skagit River, Seattle City Light
Roza Dam – Yakima River
Swift Dam – Swift Reservoir
The Dalles Dam – Lake Celilo (between Washington and Oregon)
Tieton Dam – Rimrock Lake
Wanapum Dam – Lake Wanapum
Wells Dam – Lake Pateros
Wynoochee Dam – Lake Wynoochee
Yale Dam – Yale Lake

West Virginia

Wisconsin

Wyoming

Other areas

District of Columbia

Dalecarlia Reservoir
Georgetown Reservoir
McMillan Reservoir

Guam

Puerto Rico

See also
List of dam removals in the United States
List of canals in the United States
List of dams and reservoirs
List of lakes of the United States
List of rivers of the United States
List of tallest dams in the United States
List of United States Bureau of Reclamation dams
List of waterways

External links
Interactive map of major dams in the United States

References

 
United States